Janet Semple is a retired South African politician who served as a Member of the Gauteng Provincial Legislature for the Democratic Alliance (DA) from 2010 to 2019. She was the Provincial Leader of the DA from 2010 to 2012.

Political career

Semple started her political career by serving as both the mayor and deputy mayor of Bedfordview. She was a member of the Women's National Coalition. She soon became an MP in 1999 and served as one until 2009. She was also Chairperson of the Democratic Alliance's Women Network from 2005 to 2009 and the DA's political head in Benoni.

Semple  was elected the Provincial Leader of the Democratic Alliance in April 2010. She defeated  incumbent John Moodey by just 8 votes. She was soon appointed to the Gauteng Provincial Legislature in October 2010. She became the party's provincial spokesperson on Housing and the party's head in Boksburg.

Semple announced her retirement as the provincial leader in January 2012. Her predecessor, John Moodey, was elected as her successor at the party's March 2012 conference.

She left the Gauteng Provincial Legislature at the May 2019 general election.

References

External links

Living people
People from Germiston
Members of the Gauteng Provincial Legislature
Democratic Alliance (South Africa) politicians
Women members of the National Assembly of South Africa
Members of the National Assembly of South Africa
21st-century South African politicians
20th-century South African politicians
White South African people
Year of birth missing (living people)
21st-century South African women politicians